Unthank is a small village in South Lanarkshire, Scotland.

Note

References

Villages in South Lanarkshire